Below a list of all National champions in the Men's 5000 metres (track outdoor) in track and field from several countries since 1980, some since 1970.

Australia

1980: Stephen Austin
1981: Stephen Austin
1982: Stephen Austin
1983: Stephen Austin
1984: Steve Foley
1985: Andrew Lloyd
1986: Malcolm Norwood
1987: Gerard Barrett
1988: Andrew Lloyd
1989: John Andrews
1990: Simon Doyle
1991: Rodney Higgins
1992: Andrew Lloyd
1993: Peter O'Donoghue
1994: Julian Paynter
1995: Shaun Creighton
1996: Shaun Creighton
1997: Julian Paynter
1998: Shaun Creighton
1999: Mizan Mehari
2000: Michael Power
2001: Michael Power
2002: Craig Mottram
2003: Michael Power
2004: Craig Mottram
2005: Craig Mottram
2006: Craig Mottram
2007: Craig Mottram
2008: Craig Mottram
2009: Collis Birmingham
2010: Ben St Lawrence
2011: Ben St Lawrence
2012: Harry Summers

Belgium

1970: Emiel Puttemans
1971: Emiel Puttemans
1972: Emiel Puttemans
1973: Emiel Puttemans
1974: Leon Schots
1975: Leon Schots
1976: Willy Polleunis
1977: Paul Thys
1978: Leon Schots
1979: Willy Polleunis
1980: Emiel Puttemans
1981: Emiel Puttemans
1982: Jef Gees
1983: Jean-Pierre N’Dayisenga
1984: Vincent Rousseau
1985: Eddy De Pauw
1986: Willy Goddaert
1987: Vincent Rousseau
1988: Jean-Pierre N’Dayisenga
1989: Vincent Rousseau
1990: Raymond Van Paemel
1991: Ivo Claes
1992: Gino Van Geyte
1993: Ruddy Walem
1994: Gino Van Geyte
1995: Ruddy Walem
1996: Gino Van Geyte
1997: Gino Van Geyte
1998: Gino Van Geyte
1999: Guy Fays
2000: Koen Allaert
2001: Tom Compernolle
2002: Tom Compernolle
2003: Christian Nemeth
2004: Tom Compernolle
2005: Stefan Van Den Broek
2006: Jesse Stroobants
2007: Guy Fays
2008: Guy Fays
2009: Maarten Van Steen
2010: Wesley De Kerpel
2011: Mats Lunders
2012: Mats Lunders
2013: Abdelhadi El Hachimi
2014: Abdelhadi El Hachimi
2015: Koen Naert
2016: Koen Naert

Canada

1980: Greg Duhaime
1981: Peter Butler
1982: Phil Laheurte
1983: Paul Williams
1984: Paul Williams
1985: Rob Lonergan
1986: Paul Williams
1987: Paul McCloy
1988: Paul Williams
1989: John Castellano
1990: Christian Weber
1991: Marc Olesen
1992: Philip Ellis
1993: David Reid
1994: Jeff Schiebler
1995: Jeff Schiebler
1996: Jason Bunston
1997: Jeff Schiebler
1998: Jeff Schiebler
1999: Jeff Schiebler
2000: Sean Kaley
2001: Jeremy Deere
2002: Sean Kaley
2003: Sean Kaley
2004: Reid Coolsaet
2005: Reid Coolsaet
2006: Reid Coolsaet
2007: Reid Coolsaet
2008: Ryan Mckenzie
2009: Simon Bairu
2010: Dylan Wykes
2011: Reid Coolsaet
2012: Cameron Levins

Denmark

1980: Allan Zachariassen
1981: Allan Zachariassen
1982: Allan Zachariassen
1983: Ole Hansen
1984: Keld Johnsen
1985: Henrik Jørgensen
1986: Allan Zachariassen
1987: Flemming Jensen
1988: Allan Zachariassen
1989: Stig Nørregård
1990: Klaus Hansen
1991: Henrik Jørgensen
1992: Lars Bang
1993: Klaus Hansen
1994: Klaus Hansen
1995: Mogens Guldberg
1996: Klaus Hansen
1997: Dennis Jensen
1998: Dennis Jensen
1999: Dennis Jensen
2000: Dennis Jensen
2001: Dennis Jensen
2002: Dennis Jensen
2003: Dennis Jensen
2004: Robert Kiplagat Andersen
2005: Flemming Bjerre
2006: Flemming Bjerre
2007: Jesper Faurschou

England

1980: Richjard Callan
1981: Geoff Smith
1982: Steve Emson
1983: Steve Harris
1984: Nick Rose
1985: Dave Lewis
1986: Tim Hutchings
1987: Jack Buckner
1988: Eamonn Martin
1989: Mark Rowland
1990: Eamonn Martin
1991: Eamonn Martin
1992: Jack Buckner
1993: Gary Staines
1994: Darren Mead
1995: Rob Denmark
1996: John Nuttall
1997: Kristen Bowditch
1998: Karl Keska
1999: Rob Denmark
2000: Michael Openshaw
2001: Jonathan Wild
2002: Jonathan Wild
2003: Andrew Graffin
2004: Chris Thompson
2005: Mark Miles
2006: Peter Riley
2007: Mo Farah
2010: Mo Farah

Estonia

1917*: Heinrich Paal
1918*: Jüri Lossman
1919*: Jüri Lossman
1920: Jüri Lossman
1921: Hugo Osterode
1922: Aleksander Erlich
1923: Karl Laurson
1924: Julius Tiisfeldt
1925: Karl Laurson
1926: Karl Laurson
1927: Karl Laurson
1928: Felix Beldsinsky
1929: Felix Beldsinsky
1930: Martin Prost
1931: Felix Beldsinsky
1932: Eduard Prööm
1933: Eduard Prööm
1934: Eduard Prööm
1935: Eduard Prööm
1936: Eduard Prööm
1937: Eduard Prööm
1938: Eduard Prööm
1939: Eduard Prööm
1940: Eduard Prööm
1941: -
1942: Eduard Prööm
1943: Richard Lulla
1944: Ilmar Piliste
1945: Nikolai Aleksejev
1946: Nikolai Aleksejev
1947: Nikolai Aleksejev
1948: Ilmar Reidla
1949: Mihail Velsvebel
1950: Mihail Velsvebel
1951: Erich Veetõusme
1952: Vladimir Kuts
1953: Viktor Puusepp
1954: Hubert Pärnakivi
1955: Hubert Pärnakivi
1956: Lembit Virkus
1957: Tõnu Soom
1958: Tõnu Soom
1959: Lembit Virkus
1960: Lembit Virkus
1961: Hubert Pärnakivi
1962: Hubert Pärnakivi
1963: Ants Nurmekivi
1964: Mart Vilt
1965: Mart Vilt
1966: Maido Keskküla
1967: Erik Maasik
1968: Mart Vilt
1969: Ants Nurmekivi
1970: Aleksander Tšernov
1971: Ants Nurmekivi
1972: Erik Maasik
1973: Vladimir Raudsepp
1974: Enn Sellik
1975: Erik Maasik
1976: Vladimir Raudsepp
1977: Lev Zagžetskas
1978: Sergei Ustintsev
1979: Toomas Turb
1980: Toomas Turb
1981: Rein Valdmaa
1982: Rein Valdmaa
1983: Enn Sellik
1984: Toomas Turb
1985: Toomas Turb
1986: Ain Mõnjam
1987: Toomas Turb
1988: Rein Valdmaa
1989: Heiki Sarapuu
1990: Margus Kirt
1991: Vjatšeslav Košelev
1992: Arvi Uba
1993: Henno Haava
1994: Pavel Loskutov
1995: Pavel Loskutov
1996: Heiki Sarapuu
1997: Heiki Sarapuu
1998: Pavel Loskutov
1999: Toomas Tarm
2000: Margus Pirksaar
2001: Risto Ütsmüts
2002: Margus Pirksaar
2003: Pavel Loskutov
2004: Aleksei Saveljev
2005: Tiidrek Nurme
2006: Tiidrek Nurme
2007: Tiidrek Nurme
2008: Aleksei Markov
2009: Taivo Püi
2010: Sergei Tšerepannikov
2011: Tiidrek Nurme
2012: Allar Lamp
2013: Sergei Tšerepannikov
2014: Roman Fosti 
2015: Tiidrek Nurme
2016: Keio Kits
2017: Tiidrek Nurme
2018: Tiidrek Nurme
2019: Tiidrek Nurme
2020: Tiidrek Nurme
2021: Tiidrek Nurme
2022: Kaur Kivistik

* unofficial championships

Finland

1980: Martti Vainio
1981: Martti Vainio
1982: Martti Vainio
1983: Tommy Ekblom
1984: Hannu Okkola
1985: Jari Hemmilä
1986: Tommy Ekblom
1987: Martti Vainio
1988: Matti Valkonen
1989: Risto Ulmala
1990: Harri Hänninen
1991: Harri Hänninen
1992: Jukka Tammisuo
1993: Santtu Mäkinen
1994: Pasi Mattila
1995: Santtu Mäkinen
1996: Pasi Mattila
1997: Samuli Vasala
1998: Marko Kotila
1999: Samuli Vasala
2000: Marko Kotila
2001: Samuli Vasala
2002: Samuli Vasala
2003: Jari Matinlauri
2004: Jari Matinlauri
2005: Jussi Utriainen
2006: Jussi Utriainen
2007: Jussi Utriainen
2008: Jussi Utriainen
2009: Lewis Korir
2010: Matti Räsänen
2011: Jukka Keskisalo

France

1980: Philippe Legrand
1981: Radhouane Bouster
1982: Jacques Boxberger
1983: Thierry Watrice
1984: Francis Gonzalez
1985: Jean-Louis Prianon
1986: Paul Arpin
1987: Paul Arpin
1988: Paul Arpin
1989: Pascal Clouvel
1990: Jean-Louis Prianon
1991: Mustapha Essaid
1992: Antonio Martins
1993: Atiq Naaji
1994: Mohamed Ezzher
1995: Atiq Naaji
1996: Mohamed Ezzher
1997: Abdellah Béhar
1998: Driss El Himer
1999: Rachid Chékhémani
2000: Driss El Himer
2001: Rachid Chékhémani
2002: Loïc Letelier
2003: Driss El Himer
2004: El Moktar ben Hari
2005: Loïc Letelier
2006: Frédéric Denis
2007: Malik Bahloul
2008: Nouredine Smaïl
2009: Nouredine Smaïl

Germany

East Germany

1980: Jörg Peter
1981: Hansjörg Kunze
1982: Werner Schildhauer
1983: Hansjörg Kunze
1984: Hansjörg Kunze
1985: Werner Schildhauer
1986: Hansjörg Kunze
1987: Hansjörg Kunze
1988: Axel Krippschock
1989: Stephan Freigang
1990: Stephan Freigang

West Germany

1980: Karl Fleschen
1981: Karl Fleschen
1982: Hans-Jürgen Orthmann
1983: Paul Nothacker
1984: Karl Fleschen
1985: Thomas Wessinghage
1986: Dieter Baumann
1987: Thomas Wessinghage
1988: Dieter Baumann
1989: Christian Husmann
1990: Steffen Brand

Unified Germany

1991: Dieter Baumann
1992: Dieter Baumann
1993: Rainer Wachenbrunner
1994: Dieter Baumann
1995: Dieter Baumann
1996: Dieter Baumann
1997: Dieter Baumann
1998: Dieter Baumann
1999: Dieter Baumann
2000: Jirka Arndt *
2001: Jan Fitschen
2002: Jan Fitschen
2003: Dieter Baumann
2004: Oliver Dietz
2005: Jan Fitschen
2006: Jan Fitschen
2007: Arne Gabius
2008: Arne Gabius
2009: Arne Gabius
2010: Arne Gabius
2011: Arne Gabius
2012: Arne Gabius
2013: Arne Gabius
2014: Richard Ringer
2015: Richard Ringer

* In 2000 Dieter Baumann won the race in 13:39.17, but he was later disqualified for a drug violation.

India

1992: Bahadur Prasad
2012: Rahul Kumar Pal

Italy

1907: Dorando Pietri
1908: Pericle Pagliani
1909: Ezio Cappellini
1910: Giuseppe Cattro
1911: Alfonso Orlando
1912: Alfonso Orlando (2)
1913: Oreste Luppi
1914: Primo Brega
1915-1918: not held
1919: Primo Brega (2)
1920: Carlo Speroni
1921: Carlo Speroni (2)
1922: Ernesto Ambrosini
1923: Ernesto Ambrosini (2)
1924: Angelo Davoli
1925: Giovanni Busan
1926: Angelo Davoli (2)
1927: Luigi Boero
1928: Luigi Boero (2)
1929: Luigi Boero (3)
1930: Nello Bartolini
1931: Corrado Franceschini
1932: Giuseppe Lippi
1933: Bruno Betti 
1934: Salvatore Mastroieni 
1935: Luigi Beccali 
1936: Umberto Cerati
1937: Luigi Pellin
1938: Giuseppe Beviacqua
1939: Giuseppe Beviacqua (2)
1940: Giuseppe Beviacqua (3)
1941: Giuseppe Beviacqua (4)
1942: Giuseppe Beviacqua (5)
1943: Giuseppe Beviacqua (6)
1944: not held
1945: Alfredo Lazzerini
1946: Giovanni Nocco 
1947: Giovanni Nocco (2)
1948: Giovanni Nocco (3)
1949: Mario Nocco
1950: Giovanni Nocco (4)
1951: Valentino Manzutti
1952: Giacomo Peppicelli
1953: Rino Lavelli 
1954: Giacomo Peppicelli (2)
1955: Francesco Perrone
1956: Francesco Perrone (2)
1957: Gianfranco Baraldi
1958: Antonio Ambu
1959: Luigi Conti
1960: Luigi Conti (2)
1961: Antonio Ambu (2)
1962: Antonio Ambu (3)
1963: Luigi Conti (3)
1964: Antonio Ambu (4)
1965: Antonio Ambu (5)
1966: Renzo Finelli
1967: Antonio Ambu (6)
1968: Giuseppe Ardizzone
1969: Renzo Finelli (2)
1970: Giuseppe Ardizzone (2)
1971: Franco Arese
1972: Aldo Tomasini
1973: Aldo Tomasini (2)
1974: Giuseppe Cindolo
1975: Giuseppe Cindolo (2)
1976: Giuseppe Gerbi
1977: Venanzio Ortis
1978: Piero Selvaggio
1979: Mariano Scartezzini
1980: Alberto Cova
1981: Piero Selvaggio (2)
1982: Alberto Cova (2)
1983: Alberto Cova (3)
1984: Stefano Mei
1985: Alberto Cova (4)
1986: Stefano Mei (2)
1987: Ranieri Carenza
1988: Francesco Panetta
1989: Stefano Mei (3)
1990: Renato Gotti
1991: Stefano Mei (4)
1992: Renato Gotti (2)
1993: Giuliano Baccani
1994: Angelo Carosi
1995: Francesco Bennici
1996: Umberto Pusterla
1997: Simone Zanon
1998: Angelo Carosi (2)
1999: Luciano Di Pardo
2000: Gennaro Di Napoli
2001: Salvatore Vincenti
2002: Salvatore Vincenti (2)
2003: Salvatore Vincenti (3)
2004: Michele Gamba
2005: Simone Zanon (2)
2006: Cosimo Caliandro
2007: Daniele Meucci
2008: Daniele Meucci (2)
2009: Stefano La Rosa
2010: Stefano La Rosa (2)
2011: Stefano La Rosa (3)
2012: Stefano La Rosa (4)
2013: Stefano La Rosa (5)
2014: Marouan Razine
2015: Marouan Razine (2)
2016: Yassine Rachik
2015: Marouan Razine (2)
2016: Yassine Rachik (3)
2017: Marco Najibe Salami 
2018: Marouan Razine (4)
2019: Marouan Razine (5)
2020: Ala Zoghlami
2021: Pietro Riva
2022: Yemaneberhan Crippa

Japan
The information taken from JAAF website.

1970: Toshio Miyashita
1971: Ichio Sato
1972: Keisuke Sawaki
1973: Ichio Sato
1974: Yasunori Hamada
1975: Nobuaki Takao
1976: Toshiaki Kamata
1977: Hideki Kita
1978: Hideki Kita
1979: Tatsuya Moriguchi
1980: Hisatoshi Shintaku
1981: Hisatoshi Shintaku
1982: Hisatoshi Shintaku
1983: Hisatoshi Shintaku
1984: Kenji Ide
1985: Masami Otsuka
1986: Yutaka Kanai
1987: Douglas Wakiihuri (KEN)
1988: Haruo Urata
1989: Haruo Urata
1990: Thomas Osano (KEN)
1991: Brahim Boutayeb (MAR)
1992: Nobuo Hashizume
1993: Aloys Nizigama (BDI)
1994: Katsuhiko Hanada
1995: Hisayuki Okawa
1996: Yasunari Oba
1997: Simon Maina (KEN)
1998: Simon Maina (KEN)
1999: Julius Gitahi (KEN)
2000: Zakayo Ngatho (KEN)
2001: James Wainaina (KEN)
2002: Toshinari Takaoka
2003: Kazuyoshi Tokumoto
2004: Kazuyoshi Tokumoto
2005: Tomohiro Seto
2006: Takayuki Matsumiya
2007: Takayuki Matsumiya
2008: Takayuki Matsumiya
2009: Yuichiro Ueno
2010: Yuki Matsuoka
2011: Kazuya Watanabe
2012: Kazuya Deguchi

Latvia

2008: Mareks Florošeks
2009: Valērijs Žolnerovičs
2010: Mareks Florošeks

Lithuania

1921: L.Juozapaitis
1990: Vytautas Ežerskis
1991: Raimondas Juodeška
1992: Česlovas Kundrotas
1993: Raimondas Juodeška
1994: Bronius Basalykas
1995: Dainius Virbickas
1996: Egidijus Sabaliauskas
1997: Dainius Virbickas
1998: Darius Gruzdys
1999: Pavelas Fedorenka
2000: Mindaugas Pukštas
2001: Dainius Šaucikovas
2002: Egidijus Rupšys
2003: Linas Šalkauskas
2004: Marius Diliûnas
2005: Egidijus Rupšys
2006: Dainius Šaucikovas
2007: Tomas Matijošius
2008: Tomas Matijošius
2009: Robertas Geralavičius
2010: Tomas Matijošius

Netherlands

1970: Gerard Tebroke
1971: Egbert Nijstad
1972: Egbert Nijstad
1973: Jos Hermens
1974: Jos Hermens
1975: Gerard Tebroke
1976: Gerard Tebroke
1977: Jos Hermens
1978: Klaas Lok
1979: Klaas Lok
1980: Klaas Lok
1981: Klaas Lok
1982: Klaas Lok
1983: Stijn Jaspers
1984: Marti ten Kate
1985: Rob de Brouwer
1986: Rob de Brouwer
1987: Tonnie Dirks
1988: Marti ten Kate
1989: Marti ten Kate
1990: Marcel Versteeg
1991: Marcel Versteeg
1992: Henk Gommer
1993: Henk Gommer
1994: Marcel Versteeg
1995: Kamiel Maase
1996: Kamiel Maase
1997: Kamiel Maase
1998: Marcel Versteeg
1999: Kamiel Maase
2000: Kamiel Maase
2001: Kamiel Maase
2002: Remco Kortenoeven
2003: Kamiel Maase
2004: Kamiel Maase
2005: Sander Schutgens
2006: Gert-Jan Liefers
2007: Michel Butter
2008: Sander Schutgens
2009: Michel Butter
2010: Thomas Poesiat
2011: Dennis Licht
2012: Abdi Nageeye
2013: Jesper van der Wielen
2014: Jesper van der Wielen
2015: Dennis Licht
2016: Dennis Licht
2017: Mohamed Ali
2018: Benjamin de Haan

New Zealand

1970: J. Power
1971: Mike Ryan
1972: Dick Quax
1973: Dick Quax
1974: Dick Quax
1975: S. Melville
1976: B. Jones
1977: S. Melville
1978: Rod Dixon
1979: Rod Dixon
1980: Rod Dixon
1981: Rod Dixon
1982: Tom Birnie
1983: John Bowden
1984: Peter Renner
1985: Rex Wilson
1986: David Rush
1987: David Rush
1988: Phil Clode
1989: Peter Renner
1990: Kerry Rodger
1991: Sean Wade
1992: David Rush
1993: Paul Smith
1994: Phil Clode
1995: Jonathan Wyatt
1996: Robbie Johnston
1997: Jason Cameron
1998: Alan Bunce
1999: Richard Potts
2000: Richard Potts
2001: Jonathan Wyatt
2002: Hamish Christensen
2003: Phil Costley
2004: John Henwood
2005: Dale Warrander
2006: Ben Ruthe
2007: Rees Buck
2008: Jason Woolhouse
2009: Jason Woolhouse
2010: Matt Smith
2011: Nick Willis
2012: Nick Willis
2013: Hugo Beamish
2014: Malcolm Hicks
2015: Jake Robertson
2016: Hayden McLaren
2017: Daniel Balchin
2018: Oli Chignell

Norway

1980: Anfin Rosendahl
1981: Knut Kvalheim
1982: Knut Kvalheim
1983: Stig Roar Husby
1984: Peder Arne Sylte
1985: Stig Roar Husby
1986: Are Nakkim
1987: Truls Nygaard
1988: Are Nakkim
1989: Are Nakkim
1990: Are Nakkim
1991: Eirik Hansen
1992: John Halvorsen
1993: John Halvorsen
1994: Bjørn Nordheggen
1995: Anders Aukland
1996: Jim Svenøy
1997: Jim Svenøy
1998: Kenneth Svendsen
1999: Øyvind Fretheim
2000: Øyvind Fretheim
2001: Knut Erik Rame
2002: Knut Erik Rame
2003: Marius Bakken
2004: Henrik Sandstad
2005: Marius Bakken
2006: Bård Kvalheim
2007: Bård Kvalheim

Poland

1970: Kazimierz Podolak
1971: Edward Łęgowski
1972: Bronisław Malinowski
1973: Bronisław Malinowski
1974: Henryk Nogala
1975: Bronisław Malinowski
1976: Jerzy Kowol
1977: Jerzy Kowol
1978: Jerzy Kowol
1979: Jerzy Kowol
1980: Ryszard Kopijasz
1981: Bogusław Psujek
1982: Bogusław Psujek
1983: Bogusław Mamiński
1984: Antoni Niemczak
1985: Wojciech Jaworski/Bogusław Psujek
1986: Bogusław Psujek
1987: Bogusław Mamiński
1988: Czesław Mojżysz
1989: Leszek Bebło
1990: Henryk Jankowski
1991: Michał Bartoszak
1992: Michał Bartoszak
1994: Michał Bartoszak
1994: Sławomir Kąpiński
1995: Jan Białk
1996: Waldemar Glinka
1997: Michał Bartoszak
1998: Piotr Gładki
1999: Piotr Gładki
2000: Piotr Drwal
2001: Leszek Biegała
2002: Dariusz Kruczkowski
2003: Radosław Popławski
2004: Michał Kaczmarek
2005: Radosław Popławski
2006: Michał Kaczmarek
2007: Henryk Szost
2008: Michał Kaczmarek
2009: Artur Kozłowski
2010: Radosław Kłeczek
2011: Łukasz Kujawski
2012: Radosław Kłeczek
2013: Artur Kozłowski
2014: Krystian Zalewski
2015: Krzysztof Żebrowski
2016: Krystian Zalewski
2017: Krystian Zalewski
2018: Krystian Zalewski
2019: Krystian Zalewski

Portugal

1980: Fernando Miguel
1981: António Leitão
1982: Fernando Miguel
1983: Carlos Lopes
1984: Guilherme Alves
1985: Fernando Couto
1986: Domingos Castro
1987: Domingos Castro
1988: José Regalo
1989: Domingos Castro
1990: Dionísio Castro
1991: António Monteiro
1992: Fernando Couto
1993: Luís Jesus
1994: António Pinto
1995: José Regalo
1996: José Ramos
1997: José Ramos
1998: José Ramos
1999: António Pinto
2000: Domingos Castro
2001: José Ramos
2002: Ricardo Ribas
2003: Bruno Saramago
2004: Helder Ornelas
2005: Rui Pedro Silva
2006: José Ramos
2007: José Rocha
2008: Leão Carvalho
2009: Rui Pedro Silva
2010: José Ramos
2011: Rui Silva
2012: Bruno Albuquerque

Russia

1992: Andrey Tikhonov
1993: Andrey Tikhonov
1994: Andrey Tikhonov
1995: Vener Kashayev
1996: Farid Khayrullin
1997: Sergey Drygin
1998: Sergey Drygin
1999: Sergey Lukin
2000: Sergey Drygin
2001: Mikhail Yeginov
2002: Yuriy Abramov
2003: Mikhail Yeginov
2004: Sergey Ivanov
2005: Pavel Shapovalov
2006: Sergey Ivanov
2007: Aleksandr Orlov

South Africa

1980: Samuel Leso
1981: Samuel Leso
1982: Matthews Temane
1983: Matthews Temane
1984: Stephens Morake
1985: Matthews Temane
1986: Matthews Temane
1987: Matthews Temane
1988: Matthews Temane
1989: Matthews Temane
1990: Thabang Baholo
1991: Meshack Mogotsi
1992: Anton Nicolaisen
1993: Shadrack Hoff
1994: Shadrack Mogotsi
1995: Hendrick Ramaala
1996: John Morapedi
1997: John Morapedi
1998: Meshack Mogotsi
1999: Hendrick Ramaala
2000: Whaddon Niewoudt
2001: Shadrack Hoff
2002: Norman Dlomo
2003: Frank Lekhwi
2004: Frank Lekhwi
2005: Coolboy Ngamole
2006: Tshamano Setone
2007: Morosi Boy Soke

Soviet Union

1980: Dmitriy Dmitriyev
1981: Dmitriy Dmitriyev
1982: Dmitriy Dmitriyev
1983: Dmitriy Dmitriyev
1984: Vitaliy Tyshchenko
1985: Gennadiy Temnikov
1986: Mikhail Dasko
1987: Vitaliy Tyshchenko
1988: Vitaliy Tyshchenko
1989: Mikhail Dasko
1990: Mikhail Dasko
1991: Mikhail Dasko

Spain

1980: Antonio Prieto
1981: Antonio Prieto
1982: Antonio Campos
1983: José Luis Adsuara
1984: José Manuel Albentosa
1985: José Manuel Albentosa
1986: Pere Arco
1987: Jaime López Egea
1988: Juan Carlos Paul
1989: José Luis Carreira
1990: José Luis González
1991: Abel Antón
1992: Abel Antón
1993: Abel Antón
1994: Anacleto Jiménez
1995: Enrique Molina
1996: Anacleto Jiménez
1997: Manuel Pancorbo
1998: Manuel Pancorbo
1999: Isaac Viciosa
2000: Yousef El Nasri
2001: Alberto Garcia
2002: Alberto Garcia
2003: Jesús España
2004: Carlos Castillejo
2005: Jesús España
2006: Jesús España
2007: Jesús España
2008: Jesús España
2009: Jesús España
2010: Jesús España
2011: Jesús España
2012: Manuel Angel Penas

Ukraine 

1992: Valeriy Chesak
1993: Yevhen Sirotin
1994: Valeriy Chesak
1995: Serhiy Lebid
1996: Serhiy Lebid
1997: Ihor Lishchynskyi
1998: Maksym Yanishevskyi
1999: Serhiy Lebid
2000: Serhiy Lebid
2001: Serhiy Lebid
2002: Dmytro Baranovskyy
2003: Serhiy Lebid
2004: Serhiy Lebid
2005: Vasyl Matviychuk
2006: Yevhen Bozhko
2007: Vasyl Matviychuk
2008: Vitaliy Rybak
2009: Serhiy Lebid
2010: Maksym Kryvonis
2011: Serhiy Lebid
2012: Mykola Labovskyi
2013: Oleksandr Borysyuk
2014: Ivan Strebkov
2015: Stanislav Maslov
2016: Artem Kazban
2017: Volodymyr Kyts
2018: Vasyl Koval
2019: Volodymyr Kyts
2020: Vasyl Koval

United States

1970: Frank Shorter
1971: Steve Prefontaine
1972: Mike Keough
1973: Steve Prefontaine
1974: Dick Buerkle
1975: Marty Liquori
1976: Dick Buerkle
1977: Marty Liquori
1978: Marty Liquori
1979: Matt Centrowitz
1980: Matt Centrowitz
1981: Matt Centrowitz
1982: Matt Centrowitz
1983: Doug Padilla
1984: Sydney Maree
1985: Doug Padilla
1986: Doug Padilla
1987: Sydney Maree
1988: Doug Padilla
1989: Tim Hacker
1990: Doug Padilla
1991: John Trautmann
1992: John Trautmann
1993: Matt Giusto
1994: Matt Giusto
1995: Robert Kennedy
1996: Robert Kennedy
1997: Robert Kennedy
1998: Marc Davis
1999: Adam Goucher
2000: Adam Goucher
2001: Robert Kennedy
2002: Alan Culpepper
2003: Tim Broe
2004: Tim Broe
2005: Tim Broe
2006: Bernard Lagat
2007: Bernard Lagat
2008: Bernard Lagat
2009: Matt Tegenkamp
2010: Bernard Lagat
2011: Bernard Lagat
2012: Galen Rupp
2013: Bernard Lagat
2014: Bernard Lagat 
2015: Ryan Hill
2016: Bernard Lagat
2017: Paul Chelimo
2018: Lopez Lomong
2019: Lopez Lomong

See also
 National champions 5000 metres (women)

References

External links
 GBRathletics
 ARRS site
 Australian Athletics
 New Zealand Champions
 USA Outdoor Track & Field Champions - Men's 5,000 m

Men
National
5000 metres